The Dmitriy Shostakovich class is a class of seven ro-pax ferries of project B-492/B-493 originally built by Stocznia Szczecinska im Adolfa Warskiego Warskiego in Szczecin, Poland and used by the Soviet shipping companies, Black Sea Shipping Company, Estonian Shipping Company, Baltic Shipping Company and Far Eastern Shipping Company, as ferries and passenger/cruise ships. The class is named after the first ship in the class Dmitriy Shostakovich, which in her turn was named after composer Dmitri Shostakovich.

Ship features
The ships have two restaurants, three bars, solarium, sauna and resting area.

Ferries of the Polish project B492/493

Overview

References

External links
 Автомобиле-пассажирские паромы типа "Дмитрий Шостакович" - Dmitriy Shostakovich-class Car/Passenger ferries 

Ferry classes
Ships built in Szczecin
Passenger ships of the Soviet Union
Poland–Soviet Union relations
Ships of Black Sea Shipping Company